Food porn (or foodporn) is a glamourized visual presentation of cooking or eating in advertisements, infomercials, blogs, cooking shows, and other visual media. Its origins come from a restaurant review e-commerce platform called Foodporn. Food porn often takes the form of food photography with styling that presents food provocatively, in a similar way to glamour photography or pornographic photography.

History

One of the earliest forms of the term can be found in an article by Alexander Cockburn, published in December 1977 in The New York Review of Books, in which Cockburn wrote, "True gastro-porn heightens the excitement and also the sense of the unattainable by proffering colored photographs of various completed recipes". Michael F. Jacobson used the term food porn in a 1979 newsletter of the Center for Science in the Public Interest. The term food porn was also used by the feminist critic Rosalind Coward in her 1984 book Female Desire, in which she wrote: Cooking food and presenting it beautifully is an act of servitude. It is a way of expressing affection through a gift [...] That we should aspire to produce perfectly finished and presented food is a symbol of a willing and enjoyable participation in servicing others. Food pornography exactly sustains these meanings relating to the preparation of food. The kinds of picture used always repress the process of production of a meal. They are always beautifully lit, often touched up.

The term food porn does not strictly deal with the connection between food and sexuality. In the United States, food porn is a term applied when "food manufacturers are capitalising on a backlash against low-calorie and diet foods by marketing treats that boast a high fat content and good artery-clogging potential".

In the United Kingdom, the term became popular in the 1990s due to the TV cookery programme Two Fat Ladies, after the show's producer described the "pornographic joy" the pair took in using vast quantities of butter and cream.

Connection with business
Taking a picture of food became one of the norms for the younger generation in the world as they tried to emulate Foodporn, a site that popularized the concept of posting visually appealing videos and photos of food and drink across social media. Study from YPulse shows 63% of people between thirteen years old to thirty two years old posted their food picture while they are eating on social networking services. Moreover, 57% of people in the same age range posted information of the food they were eating at that time. From the percentage, food and social media are starting to connect together as trend. People using the hashtag #foodporn helps the food industry to track audiences on social networking services.

Usage and community
The term food porn has shifted throughout its first appearances. Articles mentioned food porn as early as the late 1970s. The phrase was used in a literal manner, describing food that was unhealthy for human consumption, directly comparing it to pornography. Its use took on a new meaning in the early 2000s, when the term food porn began being used to describe food that was presented and prepared in a manner that was aesthetically appealing. This desire for food has flooded the internet, having significant effects on social media sites that provide the ability to display such as Instagram, Flickr, Snapchat, Facebook, Reddit, and Twitter. The popularity of displaying food in a physically appealing manner is driven by the users that create these communities. The use of hashtags that the users of these sites have adapted to, allow food porn to connect people in a way that documents anything about the food such as, foods that reflect cultures, calories, presentation, preparation, delicious taste, and anything else that adds to the authenticity of the meal.

Culture
The term food porn refers to images of food across various social media platforms such as TV, cooking magazines, online blogs, mobile apps, websites and social media platforms. The reason why food porn is strongly connecting with popular culture is due to the fact that people are exposed to food in their everyday lives. Food porn is not specific to social media platforms and could also be part of the category on newspaper and online blog.  Moreover, food porn is experienced globally. Language barriers that exist culturally can be bypassed by the usage of #foodporn. Food porn is used collectively by the online users and does not exclude or privilege one food over another.

Pornographic metaphor 
Contemporary literature and cinema consistently connect food and sexuality. Scholars note historical links between eating and sex, such as male and female humans coming together throughout evolution around food and creating offspring—two essential needs for survival. Today, a more obvious connection exists between the physical acts of eating and having sex in popular culture. In his book Food: The Key Concepts, Warren Belasco examines this particular resonance between kitchen and bedroom in modern-day vocabulary: "these intensely sexualized associations between eating and loving make it difficult to adopt the asceticism implied in eating responsibly. If pastry, sugar, fat, meat, and salt are so closely tied to life's most intimately pleasurable experiences, who would ever want to cut back on them?" When Alexander Cockburn defined the term gastro porn, he used the words excitement and unattainable, implying an element of fantasy that can be seen in both food porn and "traditional" pornography. With the rise of fad diets and exercise programs in the 1980s came a similar upward trend in food-related media and development of eating disorders. As people continued to restrict calories, food-related media increased in popularity due to its ability to provide the consumer with a voyeuristic indulgence of their food fantasies, similar to the voyeuristic indulgence that traditional pornography provides.

See also

 Camera eats first
 Fast food advertising
 Food blogging
 Food stylist
 Mukbang, the activity of filming the eating with explanation of it.

References

Further reading
 Hertneky, Paul, Popmatters.com (August 15, 2006). More Than a Mouthful
 Food Magazine, PioneerChef.com (January 16, 2014). Food for Sex

Food and drink terminology